A Hole Lot of Trouble is a 1971 British short comedy film. Lasting only twenty-seven minutes, it charts the efforts of a group of workmen trying to dig a hole. It was written and directed by Francis Searle and starred Arthur Lowe, Victor Maddern and Bill Maynard. It became available on DVD in the UK in 2015.

Cast
Arthur Lowe as Mr. Whitehouse
Victor Maddern as Percy
Tim Barrett as Longbottom
Bill Maynard as Bill
Ken Parry as Charles
Leslie Dwyer as Evangelist
Benny Lee as Bert
Brian Weske as Digby
Neal Arden as Military Type Man
Jack Chissick		
Michael Sharvell-Martin as Newly-wed Husband
Geraldine Gardner as Newly-wed Wife (as Trudi van Doorn)
Georgina Simpson as Carol
Hani Borelle as Fenella
Hazel Coppen as Alice

References

External links

1971 films
1971 comedy films
1971 short films
British comedy short films
1970s English-language films
1970s British films